Al-Muthanna Sport Club is an Iraqi football team based in Al-Muthanna, that plays in Iraq Division Two.

Managerial history

  Rahman Harbi
  Fares Attiyah
  Adel Jaber Al-Mayyali
  Hussein Jassim

See also 
 2001–02 Iraq FA Cup
 2002–03 Iraq FA Cup
 2018–19 Iraq FA Cup
 2021–22 Iraq FA Cup

References

External links
 Al-Muthanna SC on Goalzz.com
 Iraq Clubs- Foundation Dates

1973 establishments in Iraq
Association football clubs established in 1973
Football clubs in Muthanna